The Hardship Post was a Canadian alternative rock band, that formed in St. John’s, Newfoundland in 1992 and moved to Halifax, Nova Scotia, during the Halifax Pop Explosion of the early 1990s.

The band originally consisted of vocalist and guitarist Sebastian Lippa, bassist Mike Kean and drummer Matt Clarke. Initially signed to Murderecords, they released the EPs Mood Ring and Hack in 1993, and undertook their first cross-Canada tour to support the recordings. Mike Pick would replace Kean on bass in mid-1993.

In late 1994, they signed to Sub Pop, which released their full-length album Somebody Spoke in 1995. Around that time Clarke left the band, and was replaced by Alyson MacLeod of Jale.

Hardship Post won as Best Alternative Band at the 1994 East Coast Music Awards, and were nominated for the same award in 1996. At the Juno Awards of 1996, Somebody Spoke was a nominee for Best Alternative Album.

The band broke up in 1997.

Discography
 1992:  Sugarcane/Canopy (7" single)
 1993:  Mood Ring (EP)
 1993:  Hack (EP)
 1994:  Why Don't You and I Smooth Things Over (7" single)
 1995:  Slick Talking Jack/If I... (7" single)
 1995:  Watching You/Your Sunshine (7" single)

Studio albums
 1995:  Somebody Spoke

References

Musical groups established in 1992
Musical groups disestablished in 1997
Musical groups from St. John's, Newfoundland and Labrador
Canadian alternative rock groups
Sub Pop artists
Murderecords artists
1992 establishments in Newfoundland and Labrador
1997 disestablishments in Canada